Dilettante Press is a now defunct independent book publisher, co-founded by Jodi Wille, Nick Rubenstein, and Steven Nalepa in 1998, joined soon after by partner Hedi El Kholti. Dilettante was a publishing house dedicated to "challeng[ing] traditional notions of art and culture," focusing its efforts on featuring visionary, outsider, vernacular art in books. 

Dilettante only published three titles, but "their impact was considerable." Dilettante’s first book, The End Is Near! Visions of Apocalypse, Millennium and Utopia, won the Benjamin Franklin Award for Best First Book. Their subsequent titles included: Extreme Canvas: Hand-Painted Movie Posters from Ghana. By Ernie Wolfe, III and Starstruck: Photographs from a Fan by Gary Lee Boas, selected by Artforum Magazine as "Best of 2000".

Jodi Wille went on to co-found Process Media in 2005 with husband Adam Parfrey of Feral House. Process Media now distributes the Dilettante titles. Hedi El Kholti is currently managing editor and partner of Semiotext(e).

References

External links
Dilettante Press (via the Internet Archive Wayback Machine, actual website is domain parked)
Process Media

Book publishing companies of the United States
Publishing companies established in 1995